Zulfiqar Khan Afshar was the first khan of the Zanjan Khanate from 1747 to 1780.

References

 Anvar Changhiz Oglu, Aydın Avşar, Avşarlar, Bakı, "Şuşa", 2008,

People from Zanjan, Iran
Zanjan Khanate
1780 deaths
Ethnic Afshar people